Caryocolum majus is a moth of the family Gelechiidae. It is found in Afghanistan.

The forewings are black mottled with white. There are white markings mixed with fuscous. Adults have been recorded on wing from mid-June to late July.

References

Moths described in 1988
majus
Moths of Asia